"We in This Bitch", censored version known as "We In This", is a song by American hip hop artist DJ Drama. The song was released on February 29, 2012, as the lead single from Drama's fourth studio album Quality Street Music (2012) and was released on the independent record label Entertainment One. The posse cut was produced by Kane Beatz and features guest appearances from southern rappers Future, Young Jeezy, T.I. and Ludacris. "We in This Bitch" was written by the four rappers and DJ Drama, along with the producer of the song Kane Beatz and Jeremy Coleman. The song peaked at number 68 on the Hot R&B/Hip-Hop Songs. An official remix of the song featuring Drake and Future was released in May 2012.

Remix

The song was officially remixed and released on May 11, 2012, titled "We in This Bitch 1.5". The song features a new guest appearances from Canadian hip hop recording artist Drake and a verse from Future (since on the original version has only the chorus). The remix became available to purchase on iTunes on September 4, 2012.

Music video
The music video, directed by Benny Boom, was released on May 6, 2012.

Charts

Release

References

2012 singles
2012 songs
Jeezy songs
T.I. songs
Ludacris songs
Drake (musician) songs
Future (rapper) songs
Song recordings produced by Kane Beatz
Songs written by T.I.
Songs written by Ludacris
Songs written by Jeezy
Music videos directed by Benny Boom
Songs written by Future (rapper)
Songs written by Kane Beatz
MNRK Music Group singles